Nouri Khodayari was a Iraq–Iranian football player. He was born in Baghdad and played for Al-Omma and Aliyat Al-Shurta (only one match scoring four goals). He was known in Iraq as Nouri Qaraman. He was a Fayli Kurd and because he did not possess a certificate of nationality he was unable to sign for Aliyat Al-Shurta (one of the best teams in Iraq in the 1960s and 1970s), which was why he left Iraq as he was unable to sign for any club. Khodayari died at dawn on March 6, 2013 in Ahvaz after a heart attack. He is survived by five children, two sons and three daughters.

Playing career

Club career
Nouri moved to Iran in 1970, Ahvaz, the capital of Khuzestan province. He played for a number of clubs from Ahvaz and then spend a season with F.C. Aboumoslem.

National career
He was a member of Iran national under-20 football team in 1973 AFC Youth Championship.

Managerial career
He has held various coaching positions (technical director, head coach, assistant coach) with Khuzestani club sides.

References

Iraqi emigrants to Iran
Iranian football managers
Iranian footballers
Iraqi footballers
Sanat Naft Abadan F.C. players
F.C. Aboomoslem players
Living people
Sportspeople from Baghdad
1953 births
Iraqi Kurdish people
Iranian Kurdish people
Association football midfielders